Paweł Piotr Sobczak (born 29 June 1978 in Poland) is a Polish retired footballer.

Career

While rated as the 3rd most expensive player in Poland and attracting interest from German Bundesliga side Hertha BSC, Sobczak signed for FK Austria Wien, one of the most successful Austrian clubs. However, he had poor attitude, was distracted by his high salary there, and did not play as much due to change in head coach. After retirement, Sobczak said that he "was completely unprepared for such a trip [to Austria], especially mentally".

For the second half of 2000/01, he signed for Genoa C.F.C. in the Italian second division.

In 2002, Sobczak signed for Polish side Pogoń Szczecin before joining Austrian team Admira Wacker Mödling because of Pogoń Szczecin's financial problems.

In 2004, after playing in Cyprus with Anorthosis Famagusta, he signed for Wisła Płock in the Polish top flight.

In 2005, he signed for Polish third division outfit Podbeskidzie Bielsko-Biała on loan from Wisła Płock. From Wisła Płock, hSobczakplayed in Germany and Greece as well as the Polish lower leagues.

References

External links
 Paweł Sobczak at 90minut

Polish footballers
Living people
Association football forwards
1978 births
Wisła Płock players
FK Austria Wien players
Genoa C.F.C. players
RKS Radomsko players
Widzew Łódź players
Pogoń Szczecin players
FC Admira Wacker Mödling players
Anorthosis Famagusta F.C. players
Polonia Warsaw players
Podbeskidzie Bielsko-Biała players
FC Viktoria Köln players
GKS Katowice players
Polish expatriate footballers
Expatriate footballers in Austria
Expatriate footballers in Italy
Expatriate footballers in Cyprus
Expatriate footballers in Germany
Sportspeople from Płock